Metro 2 is a data specification created by the Consumer Data Industry Association (CDIA) for credit reporting data furnishers (who are members of the credit bureau with a data furnishing service agreement) to report consumers' credit history information to major credit bureaus electronically and in a standardized format.  It is implemented in credit reporting software packages.  The specification is extensive and is designed to standardize a wide range of credit history information while complying with federal laws and regulations in credit reporting (such as accommodating consumer disputes and disputed status of information).

Discussions on the layout can be found at the CDIA Report Specification

Computer file formats
Credit